Tristaniopsis decorticata is a species of plant in the family Myrtaceae. It is endemic to the Philippines. It is threatened by habitat loss.

References

decorticata
Vulnerable plants
Endemic flora of the Philippines
Taxonomy articles created by Polbot